Atlético Petróleos de Luanda is a multisports club from Luanda, Angola. The club's men's roller hockey team competes at local level, at the Luanda Provincial Roller Hockey Championship and at the Angolan Roller Hockey Championship. The roller hockey team of Petro Atlético has been the most titled team in Angola for many years. In recent years, its leadership has been successfully challenged by Juventude de viana, and by Académica de Luanda more recently.

In 2006, the club participated at the first world roller hockey club championship held in Luanda, having been placed 9th among 12 teams. whereas in 2008, in Reus, it ranked 14th among 16 teams.

The club was the runner-up at the 2008 African Roller Hockey Club Championship held in Luanda.

Honours

Angola Hockey League :
Winner (8): 1994, 1999, 2000, 2001, 2002, 2003, 2004, 2005
 Runner Up (4) : 2006, 2007, 2008, 2011

Angola Cup :
Winner (3): 2004, 2006, 2012
 Runner Up (9) : 2003, 2007, 2008, 2009, 2010, 2011, 2013, 2014, 2016

Angola Super Cup :
Winner (3): 2006, 2009, 2012
 Runner Up (3) : 2008, 2013, 2015

African Champions League :
Winner (0): 
 Runner Up (1) : 2008

Squad

Players

Manager history

See also
Petro Atlético Football
Petro Atlético Basketball
Petro Atlético Handball

References

External links

 Official Website
 Facebook profile

Sports clubs in Angola
Roller hockey clubs in Angola